Mount Walker is a rural locality in the Scenic Rim Region, Queensland, Australia.

Geography

The locality is bounded to the west by the Bremer River. 

The land on the upper slopes of Mount Walker is undeveloped. Part of from that, the predominant land use is grazing on native vegetation with other areas of irrigated cropping.

History 

The mountain was originally called Mount Forbes by John Oxley in honour of Sir Francis Forbes, the Chief Justice of New South Wales. However, it was later acquired the name Mount Walker. The origins of the name Walker are believed to be a shepherd of that name from the Franklyn Vale pastoral station. The locality takes its name from the mountain.

Mount Walker German Baptist Church opened in 1872. For a time it was the headquarters for the German Baptist churches, until circa 1879 that responsibility shifted to Engelsburg (now Kalbar) Baptist Church.

Mount Walker State School opened on 15 April 1878. It closed in December 1967. It was at 1775 Rosewood Warrill View Road on a  site.

Mount Walker Church of Christ opened in 1884 and celebrated its 125th anniversary in 2009.

Mount Walker Post Office opened on 1 October 1916 (a receiving office had been open from 1874) and closed in 1957.

The locality contained 50 households, in which 51.9% of the population were males and 48.1% of the population were females with a median age of 42, 4 years above the national average. The average weekly household income was $1,208, $230 below the national average. 5.3% of Mount Walker's population was either of Aboriginal or Torres Strait Islander descent. 76.3% of the population aged 15 or over was either registered or de facto married, while 23.7% of the population was not married. 34.6% of the population attended some form of a compulsory education. The most common nominated ancestries were Australian (40.1%), English (19.8%) and German (9.3%), while the most common country of birth was Australia (79.4%), and the most commonly spoken language at home was English (86.7%). The most common nominated religions were Catholic (19.4%), Not stated (18.0%) and No religion (15.1%). The most common occupation was a technician/trades worker (26.2%) and the majority/plurality of residents worked 40 or more hours per week (49.2%).

Education 
There are no school in Mount Walker. The nearest government primary schools are Mutdapilly State School in Mutdapilly to the east and Warrill View State School in Warrill View to the south-east. The nearest government secondary school is Rosewood State High School in Rosewood to the north.

Amenities 

Mount Walker Church of Christ is located at 10 Hinrichsen Road, just off the Rosewood-Warrill View Road; weekly Sunday services are held at the church.Mount Walker Public Cemetery is located at 1744–1752 Rosewood-Warrill View Road.

References

External links 

Scenic Rim Region
Localities in Queensland